Muhammad Ali and Buster Mathis fought each other in a twelve-round boxing match at the Astrodome in Houston on November 17, 1971. Ali dominated  the fight throughout and won easily on points. Ali knocked Mathis down twice in the eleventh round and twice again in the final round but refused to move in for a knockout out of compassion for Mathis. Ali had joked before the fight that "I'm going to do to Buster what the Indians did to Custer". One of the fight posters promoting the match said "Be there when the Mountain comes to Muhammad".

References

Mathis
1971 in boxing
November 1971 sports events in the United States
Boxing in Houston
1971 in Texas